Stewart Cowley (born 1947) (also Steven Caldwell, Hubert Venables) is a British writer and artist, best known for his works in the "Terran Trade Authority" universe.

Terran Trade Authority 
The original four books are:

 Spacecraft 2000-2100 AD (by Stewart Cowley, 1978) (UK  and US  Editions) [SC1]
 Great Space Battles (by Stewart Cowley and Charles Herridge, 1979) (UK /US ) [GSB]
 SpaceWreck: Ghost Ships and Derelicts of Space (by Stewart Cowley, 1979) (UK /US ) [SW]
 Starliners: Commercial Travel in 2200 AD (by Stewart Cowley, 1980) (UK /US ) [SL]

In addition, the books Spacecraft 2000-2100 AD and Great Space Battles were collected together and published as Spacebase 2000 (1984, UK /US ).

In 2005-2006 the series was republished as:

 Spacecraft 2100 to 2200 AD (by K. Scott Agnew, Jeff Lilly & Stewart Cowley) (July–August 2006) (Book info ) [SC2]
 Local Space: A Guide to the TTA Universe (October 2006)
 The Terran Trade Authority Roleplaying Game (by K. Scott Agnew & Jeff Lilly, with foreword by Stewart Cowley)  (October 2006) (Book info )

Reception 
Composer Jonn Serrie cited the series as an inspiration for a number of his own works, and said the art in the series, "came from the portfolios of some of the finest space artists in the world".

Galactic Encounters 
This series of six books was written by Stewart Cowley under the pseudonym "Steven Caldwell", for Intercontinental Book Productions (republished by Crescent Books in the US). The Galactic Encounters series was set in roughly the same universe as the official TTA books and was created partly using art rejected for inclusion in the official TTA books.

 Aliens in Space: An illustrated guide to the inhabited Galaxy (1979, UK /US )
 Star Quest: An incredible voyage into the unknown (1979, UK /US )
 The Fantastic Planet: A World of Magic and Mystery (1980, UK /US )
 Dangerous Frontiers: the fight for survival on distant worlds (1980, UK ) (Printed as Settlers in Space: The fight for survival on distant worlds in the US )
 Worlds at War: An Illustrated Study of Interplanetary Conflict (1980, UK /US )
 Space Patrol: The Official Guide to the Galactic Security Force (1980, UK /US )

Spin Off 
 The Space Warriors (1980, UK )

References 

1947 births
Living people
British science fiction writers